At a Window in the Artist's Studio is a drawing by the Danish painter, C. W. Eckersberg. It was done in 1852.

The drawing shows two girls by a window; these girls are probably the daughters of the artist. They are shown by a window facing Kongens Nytorv in Copenhagen but they are not watching anything on the square; they are reading a book.

References 

19th-century drawings
1852 works
Paintings by Christoffer Wilhelm Eckersberg
Collections of the National Gallery of Denmark